Ayman Sellouf (born 25 August 2001) is a Dutch professional footballer who plays as a forward for Pacific FC in the Canadian Premier League.

Early life
Sellouf began playing football with local club RKSV Brakkenstein. In 2014, he joined the youth system of NEC. In 2018, he scored a hat trick in a 4-0 victory over the Ajax Youth Academy in the championship final to win the U17 Cup.

Club career
In April 2019, he signed his first professional contract with NEC, signing a two-year deal, for the 2019-20 season. During the club's pre-season, he scored six goals, including a hat trick against lower tier side Overasseltse Boys. He made his official debut on 19 August 2019 against Jong Ajax. He scored his first goal on 7 February 2020 against Telstar, scoring the final goal in a 7-1 victory, which set the record for NEC's largest ever away victory. He made his first start on 28 February 2020 against NAC Breda. During the 2020-21 season, he helped the club earn promotion to the top tier Eredivise for the following season, but he did not remain with the club for that season.

In July 2021, he went on trial with FC Utrecht. In August 2021, he signed a two year contract, with an option for a third season, joining the second team Jong FC Utrecht, who played in the Eerste Divisie. In August 2022, his contract was terminated by mutual consent.

In January 2023, he joined Canadian Premier League club Pacific FC.

International career
Born in the Netherlands, Sellouf is of Moroccan descent.

He has previously attending a training camp with the Morocco U18 national team.

Career statistics

Club

References

External links
 
 

2001 births
Living people
Dutch footballers
Footballers from Nijmegen
Association football forwards
NEC Nijmegen players
Jong FC Utrecht players
Eerste Divisie players
Dutch sportspeople of Moroccan descent
Pacific FC players
Canadian Premier League players
Dutch expatriate footballers
Expatriate soccer players in Canada
Dutch expatriate sportspeople in Canada